The Portrait of Ramón Gómez de la Serna in cubist style, is a painting made by Mexican artist Diego Rivera of Spanish writer Ramón Gómez de la Serna.  It is exhibited in the MALBA in Buenos Aires.

The portrait was painted in 1915 in oil on canvas technique, its measure is 109.6 x 90.2 cm The figure, in the center of the composition, is shown fragmented into several planes of color and is represented from different conceptual points.

References
http://www.malba.org.ar/wp-content/uploads/2014/04/Rivera.pdf
http://www.letraslibres.com/blogs/correo-fantasma/diego-retrata-cubicamente-ramon

Paintings by Diego Rivera
Cubist paintings